Ternovoye is a rural locality (a selo) in Starooskolsky District, Belgorod Oblast, Russia. The population was 188 as of 2010. There are 5 streets.

Geography 
Ternovoye is located 33 km southeast of Stary Oskol (the district's administrative centre) by road. Maly Prisynok is the nearest rural locality.

References 

Rural localities in Starooskolsky District